

A

 
 
 
 
 
 
 
  (/)
  (/)
  (/)
 
  (1865)
 
  (1862)
 
 
 
 
 
 
 

Aa–Ac 

 
  (/)
 
 
  (/)
  (/)
 
 
  (/)
 
 
 
 
 
  (/)
 
 
 
  (/)
 
 
 
 
  (//)
 
 
 
 
 
  (/)
 
  (/)
 
 
 
  (/)
 
  (/)
  (/)
  (/)
 
 
 
 
  (/)
 
 
  (//, //)

Ad 

 
 
 
  (//)
  (/)
 
 
 
 
 USRC Addison F. Andrews
 
 
 
 
 
 
 
 
 
  (//)
 
 
 
 
 
 
 
 
 
 
 
 
 
 
 
 
 
  (//)
 
 
 
  (/)
  (/)
 
 
 
 
  (//)

Ae–Ak 

 
  (/)
 
 
 
 
 
 
 
 
 
  (//)
 
  (/)
 
  (/, /)
 
 
 
 
 
 
 
 
  (/)
 
 
  (/)
  (/)
 
 
 
 

Al

  (//)
 
 
  (/)
 
 
  (/)
  (//)
 
 
 
  (/)
 
  (/)
  (//)
 
 
  (/)
 
  (/)
 
  (/, /)
  (/, //)
 
 
 
  (/)
 
 
 
 
 
 
  (/)
 
 
  (//)
  (/)
 
  (//)
  (/)
 
 
 
 
 
  (/)
 
 
  (/)
 
 
  (USRC)
  (/)
  (/)
 
 
 
 
 
 
  (/, /)
 
 
  (/)
  (/)
  (/)
 
 
 
 
 
 
  (//)
  (//)
 
  (/)
 
 
 
 
  (/)
 
 
  (//)
  (/)
  (/)
  (/)
 
 
 
  (/)
 
  (/)
 
 
 
 
 
  (/)
  (/)
 
  (/, /)
  (//, ///)
 
 
 
 
 
 
 
 

Am–An 

 
 
 
 
 
  (1892/)
 
 
 
 
 
  (/)
 
 
 
  (/)
 
 
 
  (/)
 
 
  (/)
 
 
 
 
 
  (/)
 
 
  (/)
 
 
 
 
 
 
 
 
 
 
 
  (/)
  (/)
 
  (//)
  (/)
 
 
  (/)
 
 
 
 
 
 
 
 
 
  (/)
  (USRC, /)
 
 
  (///)
  (/, /)
 
  (/)
 
 
 
  (/, /)
  (//)
 
 
 
 
 
 
  (/)
  (/, /, /)
  (/)
 
  (/)
 
  (//)
 
 
 
 
 
 
 
 
  (/)

Ap–Ar 

  (/)
 
  (//)
 
 
  (/)
 
 
 
 
 
 
  (/)
 
 
 
 
 Arabian (1896)
 
  (/)
 
 
  (/, /)
 
  (/)
 
 
 
  (//)
 
 
 
  (//)
 
  (/)
 
  (ARDM-5)
  (/)
  (/)
 
  (/)
 
 
 
 
 
  (///)
  (//)
 
 
 
 
 
 
  (/)
 
  (//)
 
 
 
 
 
 
 
  (//)
 
 
 
 
  (/)
 
 
  (//)
 
 
 
 
 
  (/)
 
  (/)
 
 
 
 
 
 
 
 

As–Az 

 
 
  (/)
 
  (/)
  (/, /)
  (//)
 
 
 
 
 
 
 
  (//)
  (/)
 
  (//)
 
 
  (/)
 
  (//, /)
  (/)
 
  (/, //)
  (//)
  (//)
 
 
 
 
 
 
 
 
 
 
  (/)
  (/)
 
 
 
  (AGOR-25)
 
 
 
 
  (/)
 
 
 
 
 
 
 
  (//)
  (/)
 
 
  (/)
 
 
 
 
 
 
 
 
 
 
 
 
  (DSRV-2)
  (/)
 
 
  (/)
 
  (/, /)
  (///)
 
 
  (/)
 
 
  (/)
 
 
 
 

B
 
 
 
 
 
 

Ba

 
  (/)
 
  (/)
 
  (/)
  (/)
 
  (//)
  (/, /)
 
  (/)
  (/)
 
 
 
  (/)
  (/)
 
 
  (/)
 
  (//)
 
 
 
  (/)
 
  (/)
  (/)
 
 
 
 
 
  (/)
 
  (//)
  (/)
  (/)
 
 
  (///)
 
 
 
 
 
  (//)
  (//)
  (/)
  (/)
 
  (/)
 
 
  (/)
 
 
 
  (//, ///)
  (/, /)
  (/, /)
 
 
  (/)
 
 
  (/)
  (/, //)
 
 
  (//)

 
  (/)
 
 
  (//)
  (/)
  (/)
  (/, /)
  (/)
  (//)
 
 
 
  (//)
 
  (/)
  (/)
  (/)
  (/, /)
 
 
 
 
 
 
 
 
 
 
  (/)
  (/)
  (/)
 
 
  (/)

 

Be

  (/)
 
  (/)
  (USRC/USCGC/)
 
 
  (/, /)
 
 
 
  (//)
  (/)
 
 
 
  (/)
 
 
  (//)
 
  (/)
  (/)
  (//, /)
 
 
  (/, /)
 
  (/)
  (/)
 
 
  (/)
 
 
 
  (/)
 
 
 
  (1900s)
 
 
 
  (/)
  (/)
 
 
  (/)
 
 
 
  (/)
 
  (//)
 
 
 
 
 
 
 
 
 
 
  (//)
 
 
 
 
 
 
 
 
 
 
 
 
 
 
 
 
 
 
 
 USS Bessie Jones (SP-1476)
  (/)
 
  (/)
 
  
 
 
  (//)
  (/)

Bi–Bl 

  (/)
  (/, /, /)
 
 
 
  (/)
 
  (//)
 
 
 
 
  (/)
 
 
  (1890s)
 
  (/)
 
 
 
  (/)
  (/)
  (/)
 

  (/)
  (/, /)
 
 
 
 
  (/)
  (//)
  (/)
 
  (/)
  (/)
 
 
  (/)
 

 
  (/)
 
  (/)
 
 
 
 
 
 
  (/)
  (/)

  (//, //, //)
 
 
 
 
 
 
 
 
 
 
 
  (/, /)
 
  (//)
 

Bo 

 
 
 
  (//, /)
 
 
 
 
  (//)
  (///)
 
 
  (/)
  (//)
  (/)
  (/)
 
  (/)
  (//)
  (/)
 
  (//)
  (/)
 
 
  (/, /)
 
 
 
 
  (/)
  (/)
 
 
 
  (/)
 
  (/)
 
 
 
  (/)
  (//)
  (/)
 
 
 
 
  (/)
 
  (//)
  (/)
  (//)
 
 
  (///)
  (/)
  (/)
 
 
 

Br 

 
 
 
  (/)
 
 

  (/)
 
 
 
 
  (//, /)
  (/)
  (/)
 
  (/)
 
 
 
 
 
  (//)
 
  (/)
 
  (/)
  (/)
 
  (//, //////)
 
 
  (/)
 
 
  (/)
  (//)
 
 
 
 
 
 
 
  (/)
 
 
 
 
 
  (/)
  (/) 
 
  (/)
 
  (/)
 
  (/)
  (/)
 
  (/)
  (/)
  (/)
 
 
 
  (/)
 
 
  (/)
  (/)
  (/, /)
 
 
 
 

Bu–By 

 
 
 
 
 
  (/)
 
  (/)
  (/)
 
 
 
  (/)
 
  (/)
 
  (/)
 
 
 

 
 
 
 
 
  (/)
  (/)
 
  (/)
 
  (///)
  (/)
  (/)
 
  (/)
 
  (/)
  (/)
 
  (/)
  (/, /)
 
  (/)
  (/)
 
  (//)
 
  (/)
 
 
  (/)
  (/)
  (///)
 
 

References

Primary
 Dictionary of American Naval Fighting Ships, A
 Dictionary of American Naval Fighting Ships, B
  Naval Vessel Register, A
  Naval Vessel Register, B

Secondary
 navy.mil: List of homeports and their ships
 NavSource Naval History